Til Love Do Us Lie (Traditional Chinese: 結·分@謊情式) is a TVB modern sitcom series.

Synopsis
Bobo (Kiki Sheung) has just gotten out of work to become a full-time housewife to take care of her not-so-good son, (Dickson Wong) and become a good wife to her husband, Eric (Eddie Cheung). However, things don't usually turn out the way she wants.
Bobo's sister, Mabel, (Joyce Tang) has just failed in love, which causes her to impulsively marry Ngok-Yan (Hanjin Tan). Although she believed it was a mistake in the beginning, time seems to have changed that thought. But as their relationship goes, her mother (Suet Nei), along with a lot of obstacles, seems to be making things difficult for them.
Eric's sister, June (Lin Xiawei), spends her time managing her coffee shop while trying to deal with relationship problems. June believes the one she loves is Alvin (Benjamin Yuen), but everyone, including her mother, (Susan Tse) and father, (Bowie Wu) doesn't really think it's a good choice.
This series focuses on everyday life and how the characters face problems related to families, friends, love, careers, and dreams.

Cast
 Eddie Cheung as Eric Suen
 Kiki Sheung as Bobo Kan
 Hanjin Tan as Ng Ngok-yan
 Joyce Tang as Mable Kan
 Benjamin Yuen as Alvin Ko
 Rosina Lam as June Suen
 Bowie Wu as Suen Fung-kei
 Susan Tse as Lei Gai-fong
 Jess Shum as 林菁華
 Mannor Chan as Gwai Mei-lai
 Suet Nei as Lo Siu-hung
 Dickson Wong as Ocean Suen
 Ronald Law as Ken Kan
 Rachel Poon as Zoe

Viewership ratings

References

External links
TVB.com Til Love Do Us Lie - Official Website 

TVB dramas
2011 Hong Kong television series debuts
Hong Kong television sitcoms
2012 Hong Kong television series endings